, provisional designation: , is a centaur, approximately  in diameter, orbiting in the outer Solar System between Saturn and Neptune. It was discovered on 16 September 2006, by American astronomers Andrew Becker, Andrew Puckett and Jeremy Kubica at Apache Point Observatory in Sunspot, New Mexico.

Orbit and classification 

Centaurs have short dynamical lives due to strong interactions with the giant planets.

It orbits the Sun at a distance of 11.9–32.0 AU once every 103 years and 2 months (37,683 days; semi-major axis of 22.0 AU). Its orbit has an eccentricity of 0.46 and an inclination of 36° with respect to the ecliptic. The body's observation arc begins with its official discovery observation at Apache Point in September 2006.

Physical characteristics 

See also

References

External links 
 Distant Minor Planets 248835 & 2009 MS9 (Remanzacco Observatory - August 15, 2012)
 List Of Centaurs and Scattered-Disk Objects, Minor Planet Center
 

248835
Discoveries by Andrew C. Becker
Discoveries by Andrew W. Puckett
Discoveries by Jeremy Martin Kubica
20060916